The 2018–19 Stanford Cardinal women's basketball team represented Stanford University during the 2018–19 NCAA Division I women's basketball season. The Cardinal, led by thirty-third year head coach Tara VanDerveer, played their home games at the Maples Pavilion and are members of the Pac-12 Conference. They finished the season 31–5, 15–3 in Pac-12 play to finish in second place. They won the Pac-12 women's tournament by defeating Oregon and earns an automatic the NCAA women's tournament where they defeated UC Davis and BYU in the first and second rounds, Missouri State in the sweet sixteen before losing to Notre Dame in the elite eight.

Roster

Schedule

|-
!colspan=9 style=| Exhibition

|-
!colspan=9 style=| Non-conference regular season

|-
!colspan=9 style=| Pac-12 regular season

|-
!colspan=9 style=| Pac-12 Women's Tournament

|-
!colspan=9 style=| NCAA Women's Tournament

 The game between Stanford and Ohio State had been originally scheduled for November 18, 2018, but was cancelled due to wildfires.

Rankings
2018–19 NCAA Division I women's basketball rankings

^Coaches did not release a Week 2 poll.

See also
2018–19 Stanford Cardinal men's basketball team

References

Stanford Cardinal women's basketball seasons
Stanford
Stanford